List of chicken breeds
 List of German chicken breeds
 List of French chicken breeds
 List of Italian chicken breeds
 List of Spanish chicken breeds
 Chicken breeds recognized by the American Poultry Association
 List of true bantam chicken breeds
 List of duck breeds
 List of turkey breeds
 List of goose breeds
 List of pigeon breeds

By country
 Australia - List of breeds in the Australian Poultry Standards
 Italy - List of Italian poultry breeds
 Slovenia - List of Slovenian domestic animal breeds
 UK - List of breeds in the British Poultry Standards
 Shetland - Shetland animal breeds
 USA - Chicken breeds recognized by the American Poultry Association

Poultry breeds
Agriculture-related lists
Lists of animals